Torbert Street Livery Stables, also known as Hercules Powder Company Printing Department, Charles Printing Co., Wilmington Motorcycle Club, Cann Bros & Kindig Printers, and Barclay Bros Printing, is a historic livery stable located at Wilmington, New Castle County, Delaware. It was built in 1887, and consists of two separately-built, two-story
livery stables, joined and expanded through additions and internal alterations. A connecting hyphen was built during or after 1946. Both structures are constructed of brick and have gable roofs.  The interior consists of large open spaces supported by cast iron columns and historic wood beams reinforced with iron rods.  Also on the property is a contributing cast iron street lamp.  The buildings housed livery stables into the early 20th century, after which they were occupied as a cabinet-making shop, a cycle club, auto garages, commercial and corporate printing facilities, and a warehouse.

It was added to the National Register of Historic Places in 1998.

References

Commercial buildings on the National Register of Historic Places in Delaware
Commercial buildings completed in 1887
Buildings and structures in Wilmington, Delaware
National Register of Historic Places in Wilmington, Delaware
1880s establishments in Delaware
Stables in the United States